Kunburudhoo (Dhivehi: ކުނބުރުދޫ) is one of the inhabited islands of Alif Dhaal Atoll.

Geography

Demography

The population of the island is around 600.

References

Islands of the Maldives